San Fabian, officially the Municipality of San Fabian,  is a 1st class municipality in the province of Pangasinan, Philippines. According to the 2020 census, it has a population of 87,428 people.

Etymology
The town got its name after Saint Fabian during the Spanish era.

History

The town used to be called Angio, and had been a mission territory of friars of the Dominican Order during the Spanish era. It is named after Saint Fabian, who was a pontiff and saint of the Roman Catholic Church.

Around 1818, San Fabian had a boundary dispute with Mangaldan. The boundary between the two towns was the Angalacan river, which sometimes overflows because of floods. The boundary dispute was settled in 1900, when the mayor of San Fabian agreed to meet the mayor of Mangaldan and the two reached an agreement with a boundary marker being erected at Longos between the towns of San Fabian and Mangaldan. The agreement was signed by Juan Ulanday, Nicolas Rosa, Vicente Padilla, Marcelo Erfe, and approved by the American Commander Capt. Ferguson.

During the Philippine–American War, hundreds of Pangasinense soldiers and soldiers of the Philippine government died in San Fabian battling the Americans. After the pacification of Pangasinan by the United States, the first town President of San Fabian was Ińigo Dispo. In 1903, the town of Alava became a part of San Fabian and became a mere village or barrio.

During World War II, the liberation of US Naval and Marine forces in Pangasinan started when troops under Gen. Walter Krueger landed on Lingayen  and San Fabian beaches. San Fabian landing zones were called White and Blue beaches, names which continue until the present time.

In October 2009, San Fabian was among the places heavily affected by the floods caused by the release of water by the San Roque Dam at Rosales during the height of the Typhoon Pepeng.

Geography
San Fabian is geographically located in the northern portion in Pangasinan, bordering the provincial boundaries of La Union. It has a land area of 8,129 hectares. It is bounded in the north by Rosario (La Union), Sison in the northeast, Mangaldan in the south, Pozorrubio and San Jacinto in the southeast, Dagupan in the southwest, and in the west by Lingayen Gulf.

Barangays
San Fabian is politically subdivided into barangays. These barangays are headed by elected officials: Barangay Captain, Barangay Council, whose members are called Barangay Councilors. All are elected every three years.

Climate

Demographics

Economy

Government
San Fabian, belonging to the fourth congressional district of the province of Pangasinan, is governed by a mayor designated as its local chief executive and by a municipal council as its legislative body in accordance with the Local Government Code. The mayor, vice mayor, and the councilors are elected directly by the people through an election which is being held every three years.

The present Mayor of San Fabian is Marlyn Espino-Agbayani, the second woman to be elected as the Local Chief Executive of the said town. Current Vice Mayor is former Mayor Constante Batrina Agbayani, the husband of the current Mayor. Former Vice Mayor Dr. Leopoldo N. Manalo is the only Vice Mayor to be elected and have completed the three-term limit on the said position. Former Mayor Irene F. Libunao is the first woman to be elected as Mayor in the municipality, who served from 2010 to 2013.

Prominent members of San Fabian were Chief Justice Andres Narvasa, former Mayor and Senior Board Member of Pangasinan Atty. Conrado Pinlac Gubatan, Dr. Gregorio Tercero De Guzman,  Atty. Perfecto V. Fernandez. San Fabian is also the hometown of another prominent member, Board Member Marinor Baltazar-De Guzman - the first woman to be elected as the Sangguniang Panlalawigan Member of Pangasinan representing the 4th Provincial District.

Elected officials

Gallery

Notable People
Bella Poarch, Filipino-American singer and social media star, raised in San Fabian

References

External links

 San Fabian Profile at PhilAtlas.com
 San Fabian Government Website
  Municipal Profile at the National Competitiveness Council of the Philippines 
 San Fabian at the Pangasinan Government Website
 Local Governance Performance Management System
 [ Philippine Standard Geographic Code]
 Philippine Census Information

Municipalities of Pangasinan